Now We Are Six is a 1927 book of children's poetry by A. A. Milne, with illustrations by E. H. Shepard. It is the second collection of children's poems following Milne's When We Were Very Young, which was first published in 1924. The collection contains thirty-five verses, including eleven poems that feature Winnie-the-Pooh illustrations.

Contents

Analysis 

The book's collection of poems have recurring themes of childlike innocence and characteristics that numerous scholars have studied. The cognitive psychologist George Miller has argued that the poem "In the Dark" was inspired by crib talk.  Furthermore, "In the Dark" can be read as an endorsement of childhood  "as a golden era where... innocence, unqualified parental love, [and] irresponsibility" are commonly occurring traits. Author Elena Goodwin postulates that "King Hilary and the Beggarman" characterizes the poem's titular character as "like a small child, [that] excitedly anticipates the various Christmas gifts that" he will receive.

Legacy 
The book's title and function as a collection of poems has been parodied or influential following its publication. In 2003, Neil Gaiman released Now We Are Sick, a poem anthology book featuring sci-fi, fantasy, and horror poems that thirty authors wrote.  In 2017, the BBC and James Goss released Doctor Who: Now We Are Six Hundred, which featured a collection of poems about The Doctor with illustrations by then Doctor Who show-runner, Russel T. Davies.

By 1928, soprano Mimi Crawford recorded some poems from the collection set to music. Harold Fraser-Simon created the compositions.

The poem "Us Two" features Christopher Robin and Winnie-the-Pooh spending time together. Some of the language in this poem is reminiscent of the song "Forever & Ever" from Pooh's Grand Adventure.

The book entered the public domain in the United States in 2023 along with other 1927 works.

References

External links
Full text of Now We Are Six at Faded Page

1927 children's books
1927 poetry books
British children's books
Winnie-the-Pooh books
Poetry by A. A. Milne
Children's poetry books
English poetry collections
Books illustrated by E. H. Shepard
Methuen Publishing books
Public domain in the United States